P77 may refer to:
 Bell XP-77, an American prototype fighter aircraft
 , a submarine of the Royal Navy
 , a corvette of the Indian Navy
 Papyrus 77, a biblical manuscript
 P77, a state regional road in Latvia